The members of the National Assembly of Zambia from 1978 until 1983 were elected on 12 December 1978. The country was a one-party state at the time, meaning the only party represented was the United National Independence Party. An additional ten members were nominated by President Kenneth Kaunda.

List of members

Elected members

Replacements by by-election

Non-elected members

Replacements

References

1978